Auvil is an unincorporated community in Tucker County, West Virginia, United States. Auvil is located northwest of St. George on the west bank of the Cheat River. Auvil lies along West Virginia Route 72. According to the Geographic Names Information System, the community has also been known as Auviltown.

References 

Unincorporated communities in Tucker County, West Virginia
Unincorporated communities in West Virginia